Roberto Lorenzini (born 9 July 1966 in Milan) is an Italian professional football coach and a former player, who served as a defender.

Playing career
A Milan youth product, Lorenzini played for 7 seasons (126 games, 1 goal) in the Serie A for A.C. Milan (10 appearances), Calcio Como, A.C. Ancona, Genoa C.F.C., Torino Calcio, and Piacenza Calcio, later also playing with Serie B side Lucchese, and Serie C2 side Faenza.

Managerial career
In 2008–09 season he served as an assistant manager to his former Milan teammate Alessandro Costacurta at A.C. Mantova, but left together with Costacurta after he resigned due to poor results.

Honours
Milan
 Supercoppa Italiana winner: 1994.

References

1966 births
Living people
Italian footballers
Italy under-21 international footballers
Serie A players
Serie B players
A.C. Milan players
Como 1907 players
A.C. Ancona players
Genoa C.F.C. players
Torino F.C. players
Piacenza Calcio 1919 players
S.S.D. Lucchese 1905 players
Italian football managers
Association football defenders